Chaetocnema denticulata, the toothed flea beetle, is a species of flea beetle in the family Chrysomelidae. It is found in North America.

Description
Thorax with no features: elytra with dents. Mid and rear segment with teeth.

References

Further reading

 
 

Alticini
Articles created by Qbugbot
Beetles described in 1807
Insect pests of millets
Taxa named by Johann Karl Wilhelm Illiger